Koubi is a village and seat of the commune of Ouro Guiré in the Cercle of Ténenkou in the Mopti Region of southern-central Mali. The village lies on the north (left) bank of the Diaka, a branch of the Niger River that flows only when the river is in flood. Opposite Koubi, on the right bank, is the village of Sanga.

References

Populated places in Mopti Region